The 2021–22 NIFL Championship (known as the Lough 41 Championship for sponsorship reasons) was the fifth season of the NIFL Championship since gaining senior status. It is the second-tier of the Northern Ireland Football League - the national football league in Northern Ireland. The season began on 7 August 2021 and concluded on 30 April 2022.

The Championship returned after a one-year hiatus, following the cancellation of the 2020–21 season due to the COVID-19 pandemic in Northern Ireland.

Portadown were the champions from the 2019–20 season. However, as they won promotion to the 2020–21 NIFL Premiership before the COVID-19 hiatus, they could not defend their title. Newry City were confirmed as champions on the final day of the 2021–22 season.

Teams

The 2021–22 NIFL Championship was contested by 12 teams, ten of which retained their Championship status from the 2019–20 season. Portadown were champions in the previous season, and were promoted to the 2020–21 NIFL Premiership. They were replaced by the bottom team in the NIFL Premiership, Institute. Runners-up Ballinamallard United missed out on promotion, as the NIFL Premiership play-off was cancelled as a result of the COVID-19 pandemic in Northern Ireland.

The bottom Championship team from the previous season, PSNI, were relegated to the third-tier NIFL Premier Intermediate League. They were replaced by Annagh United, winners of the Premier Intermediate League. The eleventh-placed Championship team from the previous season, Knockbreda, had a reprieve, as the NIFL Championship play-off was cancelled as a result of the COVID-19 pandemic in Northern Ireland.

Stadia and locations

League table

Results

Matches 1–22
During matches 1–22 each team played every other team twice (home and away).

Matches 23–33
During matches 23–33 each team played every other team for the third time (either at home, or away).

Matches 34–38
For the final five matches the table split into two halves, with teams ranked 1st–6th in Section A and teams ranked 7th–12th in Section B. During matches 34–38 each team played every other team in their respective section once. The fixtures were reversed from those played during rounds 23–33, ensuring that teams had played every other team in their respective section twice at home and twice away overall throughout the season.

Top six

Bottom six

NIFL Championship play-off
The eleventh-placed club, Knockbreda, faced the second-placed club from the 2021–22 NIFL Premier Intermediate League, Bangor, for one place in the following season's Championship.

Knockbreda won 4–2 on aggregate.

Season statistics

Top scorers

References

External links

NIFL Championship seasons
Northern Ireland
2021–22 in Northern Ireland association football